The dental midline is the midsagittal line of maxillary and mandibular dental arches possessing teeth of ideal size, shape, and position, when situated in maximum intercuspation.  Each arch also possesses its own midline, which can be used to refer to the location of contact between the mesial surfaces of the central incisors.  Thus, if an individual's mandibular teeth are shifted over to the left in a mesial-distal dimension, by 2 mm, for example, that individual's midline would be said to be deviated 2 mm to the left.

References

 Ash, Major M.; Nelson, Stanley. WHEELER'S DENTAL ANATOMY, PHYSIOLOGY AND OCCLUSION, 8th edition.

Dental anatomy
Restorative dentistry